is a Japanese manga series written and illustrated by Yuki Kodama. It was serialized in the manga magazine Monthly Flowers from 2007 to 2012, and was published as ten tankōbon volumes (collected editions) by Shogakukan. The series follows Kaoru Nishimi, an introverted high school student who discovers jazz music through his friendship with his delinquent classmate Sentarō Kawabuchi.

The series has been adapted twice: as a television anime series in 2012, and as a live action film directed by Takahiro Miki in 2018. The anime adaptation is directed by Shinichirō Watanabe with music by Yoko Kanno, making it the third collaboration between Watanabe and Kanno following Macross Plus (1994–1995) and Cowboy Bebop (1998). The series was produced by MAPPA and Tezuka Productions, and aired on Fuji TV's Noitamina programming block. In North America, the series was licensed by Sentai Filmworks and aired on the streaming service Crunchyroll, which simulcast the series during its original broadcast run.

The anime adaption of Kids on the Slope was widely acclaimed, with praise given to its direction, narrative, and music. Critics explored Kids on the Slopes depiction of Catholicism in Japan, its themes of male friendship and subtextual homoeroticism, and its relation to Watanabe's broader canon of works in their analysis of the series. Multiple outlets listed Kids on the Slope as among the best anime of the 2010s.

Synopsis

Kaoru Nishimi is an intelligent, introverted first-year high school student from a wealthy family who moves to different cities frequently as a result of his father's career; consequently, he has never made lasting friendships. In the summer of 1966, he relocates from Yokosuka, Kanagawa to Sasebo, Nagasaki to live with his extended family. On his first day of school he encounters Sentarō Kawabuchi, a delinquent student feared by his classmates. Sentarō's love of jazz music inspires Kaoru to study the genre, and the two boys begin to develop a close friendship through jazz sessions at a record shop owned by the family of Ritsuko Mukae, a classmate. The slice of life series follows Kaoru, Sentarō, and Ritsuko over the course of their three years of high school, and the relationships that develop among and between them.

Characters

Primary characters

A high school student from a wealthy family who moves to his uncle's home in Kyushu in the summer of 1966. Due to his introversion and the frequency with which he moves because of his father's career, he has never developed lasting friendships. Kaoru is a skilled pianist familiar with classical music, though his friendship with Sentarō Kawabuchi inspires him to begin performing jazz. He possesses romantic feelings for his classmate Ritsuko Mukae, which are initially unrequited due to her feelings for Sentarō. 

The child of an American serviceman and a Japanese mother, Sentarō was orphaned at a young age and faced discrimination because of his parentage. He is outwardly an aggressive delinquent, but is a kind and caring person to his friends, and a loving brother to his multiple adopted siblings. He is a skilled jazz drummer, and grows close to Kaoru by sharing his love for the genre with him. He is Catholic, indicated by the rosary he wears around his neck at all times, and ends the series as a priest-in-training.

A classmate of Kaoru and Sentarō, and longtime friend of the latter. Her family owns a record store that serves as a practice space for Kaoru and Sentarō. Like Sentarō, she is Catholic, and begins the series with romantic feelings for him. As the series progresses, her feelings shift from Sentarō to Kaoru.

Supporting characters

A strong-willed high school student and member of the art club. She becomes acquainted with Sentarō by chance after he intervenes when she is harassed by a group of men; he falls in love with her, though she ultimately develops feelings for Junichi. She and Junichi eventually wed and start a family together.

A longtime friend of the Kawabuchi and Mukae families who plays trumpet. Junichi is idolized by Sentarō, whom he sees as akin to an older brother. While attending university in Tokyo he becomes involved in the Zenkyoto student protest movement, and later drops out of school and is disowned by his family. He marries Yurika, and they raise a family together.

Ritsuko's father, and the owner of the record shop where Sentarō and Kaoru play jazz. He plays double bass.

A member of the art club who dreams of becoming a famous singer to support his family. He asks Sentarō to play drums at the school festival with his band, to Kaoru's chagrin.

A member of the radio club. A train enthusiast who plays guitar.

Kaoru's cousin. Has a somewhat spoiled and bratty personality.

Media

Manga
Kids on the Slope, written and illustrated by Yuki Kodama, was serialized by Shogakukan in the monthly josei (aimed at teenaged girls and adult women) manga magazine Monthly Flowers from 28 September 2007 to 28 January 2012. Kids on the Slope: Bonus Track, a spin-off series that was released immediately following the conclusion of the manga series, was published in the same magazine from 28 March to 28 July 2012. In Japan, the series was collected into ten tankōbon volumes published by Shogakukan from 25 April 2008 to 9 November 2012. The series' run consists of the original 90 chapter series, collected as the first to ninth tankōbon volumes; Bonus Track was published as its own unnumbered tankōbon. Internationally, the series has been licensed in French, Spanish, Italian, and Taiwanese Mandarin.

Anime

Development

An anime adaptation of Kids on the Slope produced by MAPPA in association with Tezuka Productions was released in 2012. It was the first anime series produced by MAPPA, which was founded by Masao Maruyama in 2011 after his departure from the studio Madhouse. Maruyama co-founded Madhouse in 1972, and approached Shinichirō Watanabe to direct Kids on the Slope on the basis of their previous work at Madhouse together. Watanabe spent the three years prior to the release of Kids on the Slope developing projects for Madhouse that ultimately stalled in planning phases or were cancelled, leading Maruyama to offer Watanabe the series to direct "as something to do." The series was heralded as a "triumphant return to the mainstream" for Watanabe following a seven-year hiatus from directing anime, which spanned from the conclusion of his previous series Samurai Champloo in 2005.

Kids on the Slope was Watanabe's first anime series adapted from an existing work, rather than based on an original concept. Maruyama stated that Watanabe initially resisted the prospect of creating an adaptation and expressed concerns over a lack of creative freedom, but agreed after learning that the series was about jazz (music frequently forms a core element of Watanabe's works), and after Kids on the Slope network Fuji TV agreed to greenlight his subsequent anime series Terror in Resonance. After reading the original Kids on the Slope manga, Watanabe noted that while jazz music forms the basis of the story, he was interested in its approach to plot and characterization, particularly "the kind of way that it portrays emotional distance." Upon learning that Watanabe was developing a new anime series, composer Yoko Kanno asked to be involved in its production. While Kanno has stated that she is not a fan of jazz music, she sought to be involved in Watanabe's next project after their previous collaborations on Macross Plus and Cowboy Bebop.

Production

The primary production staff for Kids on the Slope is composed of Watanabe as director, Kanno as composer, Nobuteru Yūki as character designer, Yoshimitsu Yamashita as chief animation director, and Ayako Katō and Yūko Kakihara as scriptwriters. The series was Watanabe's first single cour series; on adapting the series with a compressed number of episodes, Watanabe noted that a manga series of Kids on the Slopes length would typically have been adapted as 15 or 16 episodes, "so trying to fit it into 12 episodes necessitated a bit of rushing."

Maruyama estimates that "about half" of the production time and budget for the series went towards creating its musical performance scenes. Though Maruyama had experience depicting musical performances in animation through his work on Beck: Mongolian Chop Squad and Forest of Piano at Madhouse, he found that "jazz performance turned out to be a huge challenge." Despite pressure to render the performance scenes as computer-generated imagery to reduce time and costs, Watanabe rendered these scenes using hand-drawn animation by utilizing motion capture: real-life musicians were filmed performing the scene's music from multiple angles, which was then edited into a single "scene" that animators used as photo reference.

Watanabe and Kanno found jazz artists to perform the series' soundtrack and motion capture by searching videos on YouTube. They sought young artists who were "rough and therefore charming," with Watanabe noting that it "would be terrible if we asked veteran studio musicians to perform it in a "young style'." Pianist Takashi Matsunaga and drummer  were cast to record the music and motion capture for Kaoru and Sentarō, respectively.

Music

The series' soundtrack consists of an original score and cover versions of existing jazz songs. Each episode of the series is named after a jazz standard, with the titles, lyrics, and/or music of each song typically having significance with regards to the events of the episode. As majority of the series' music consists of diegetic jazz performance, its score is minimal, with Kanno noting that Kids on the Slope is a "work built on the jazz part alone, and we'd just need music for atmosphere." While Kanno was initially told by Watanabe that she would only have to produce the score for the series, she ultimately produced both its score and jazz performances. In preparation for the series, Kanno visited jazz clubs and researched recording techniques of the 1950s and 1960s; for Kaoru and Sentarō's performance scenes, Kanno elected to record both drums and piano simultaneously (rather than record the instruments separately and later arrange them digitally, as is standard in modern music production) to emulate these recording techniques.

The series uses two pieces of theme music: its opening theme "" is written and performed by Yuki, while its closing theme "" is written and performed by Motohiro Hata. Due to production delays, the opening sequence was animated before its music was produced; delays also forced the opening sequence to be produced by a staff that was entirely separate from the main series animation staff, a move Maruyama noted as "not something you see with anime very often."

Release

The adaptation was announced in the December 2011 issue of Monthly Flowers. Kōji Yamamoto, the producer of Fuji TV's Noitamina programming block, confirmed that same month that the series would air on the network beginning in April. The first trailer for the series was released in January 2012, alongside an announcement of the series' production staff. The twelve-episode series aired on Noitamina from 12 April to 28 June 2012.

In English-language markets, the series is licensed by Sentai Filmworks and aired on the streaming service Crunchyroll, which simulcast the series during its original broadcast run. An English language dubbed version of the series was also produced by Sentai Filmworks; episodes aired on Anime Network and Hulu one month after streaming on Crunchyroll. Sentai Filmworks additionally produced the North American home video release of Kids on the Slope, which was released on Blu-ray and DVD on 7 May 2013. In 2014, the series aired on Viz Media's now-defunct streaming service Neon Alley. The Blu-ray was re-released on 13 April 2021. The series was released in the UK by MVM Films and in Australia by Hanabee.

Live-action film
A live-action film adaptation of Kids on the Slope was announced in the June 2017 issue of Monthly Flowers published on 27 April 2017. Kids on the Slope publisher Shogakukan confirmed the adaptation the following day, along with an announcement of the film's cast and primary production staff. The actors underwent speech and music training in advance of production, with Chinen and Nakagawa studying piano and drums, respectively, and Nakagawa and Komatsu trained to speak in a Sasebo dialect; Dean Fujioka, who portrays Junichi, was trained to play the trumpet. The trailer for the film was released on 15 October 2017, with the film itself released on 10 March 2018.

Other media
Several soundtrack albums collecting music from the series have been published. In 2009, EMI Music Japan published Kids on the Slope Original Soundtrack, a compilation album collecting songs referenced in the manga series. The album is composed of both licensed original recordings and cover versions by the Japanese jazz quartet Quasimode. In 2012, Epic Records Japan published the identically-titled Kids on the Slope Original Soundtrack, which collects songs used in the anime adaption of the series and Yoko Kanno's original score; an expanded edition of the soundtrack, Kids on the Slope Original Soundtrack: Plus More & Rare, was published that same year. In 2018, Ariola Japan published Kids on the Slope Soundtrack & Jazz Music Collection, which collects the soundtrack of the live-action film adaptation of the series.

The series was hosted by Kaoru voice actor Ryōhei Kimura, and featured voice actors from the anime series as guests.

Themes and analysis

Series creator Yuki Kodama based Kids on the Slope on her own experience of growing up in Sasebo, Nagasaki, where the series is set. Jazz figured heavily in Sasebo's music scene beginning in the 1920s and 1930s; the city houses a major naval base for the Japan Maritime Self-Defense Force (then the Imperial Japanese Navy), which attracted nightclubs and cabarets to the area. Several real-life locations in and around Sasebo appear in Kids on the Slope, notably the Megane-iwa ( "Spectacles Rock"), and the Kuroshima Catholic church on the Kujūku Islands.

In his book Holy Anime! Japan's View of Christianity, writer Patrick Drazen remarks on the series' depiction of Catholicism in Japan, citing Kids on the Slope as an example of how "in the Japanese scheme of things, religion can be a factor of geography and even genetics, and [is] not exclusively a profession of faith." In particular, Drazen notes how the stigmatization Sentarō faces because of his hāfu racial identity is compounded by his Catholic religious identity. Drazen further identifies Kids on the Slope as an example of a work that juxtaposes Catholicism and Western popular music, comparing it to media such as "Dominique" by The Singing Nun and the Sister Act series of films.

Multiple critics noted a homoerotic dimension to Kaoru and Sentarō's canonically platonic friendship. Jacob Parker-Dalton of Otaquest cites the series' homoerotic subtext as an example of the influence of the boys' love genre (male-male romance) on the josei demographic, noting how Sentarō and Kaoru conform to typical seme and uke ("top" and "bottom") character archetypes. Writer Madeline Ashby argues that though its homoerotic content is rendered as subtext, Kids on the Slope represents Watanabe's first attempt to engage seriously with LGBT subject material in his work, after previously depicting LGBT characters in passing or as the punchlines for jokes. Parker-Dalton notes that Watanabe's works subsequent to Kids on the Slope similarly feature serious portrayals of LGBT characters and themes, as seen in the bishōnen-style character designs of Terror in Resonance and the presence of multiple LGBT characters in Carole & Tuesday.

Kids on the Slope was also discussed by critics in relation to Watanabe's broader canon of works, with Parker-Dalton identifying the series as a "watershed" moment for Watanabe's career representing "the final evolution of the director’s lifelong obsession with music." Ashby notes how the series' theme of male friendship is one that recurs in Watanabe's works, which depict "unlikely pairs of men (or boys) who are either thrown together by circumstance or are drawn together by their mutual histories." She argues that Kids on the Slope represents metatextual commentary by Watanabe on his previous works Cowboy Bebop and Samurai Champloo, as he uses design elements, setting, and characterization to "evoke [his] other works while keeping each story completely independent."

Reception
The manga was the top-ranked manga for women in the 2009 edition of Takarajimasha's annual Kono Manga ga Sugoi! rankings and won the 57th Shogakukan Manga Award in 2012 for general manga. Reviewing the first volume of the series for The Asahi Shimbun, critic Shigeko Matsuo praised Kodama's characterization, but criticized its love triangle plot conceit.

The anime adaptation of Kids on the Slope was acclaimed by critics, and was listed as among the best anime of 2012 by Anime News Network, among the best anime of the 2010s by IGN, Crunchyroll, and Thrillist, and among the best anime of all time by Paste. In 2013, Yoko Kanno won Best Music at the Tokyo Anime Awards for her work on Kids on the Slope and Aquarion Evol. Theron Martin reviewed the series positively for Anime News Network, noting that while Kids on the Slope is "more pedestrian" than Watanabe and Kanno's previous collaborations, he offered praise for its character development, music, and visual style. Otaku USA commended "the driving emotion of the music, the animation thereof, and incredibly well-written tale of growing up," calling Watanabe's direction and Kanno's music production as "a perfect balance for the series." In his review of the series for IndieWire, Charles Solomon noted that the series showcases Watanabe's "versatility as a director and his ability to create characters with depth and believability." Kirk Hamilton of Kotaku wrote that while the series' "dreamy, romantic vibe" may be off-putting to viewers who discovered Watanabe through his work on Cowboy Bebop, but argued that "to dismiss Kids on the Slope would be a huge mistake. Like Cowboy Bebop, Kids is a thing of visual and aural beauty, a celebration of art that lives in its smallest details." Nicoletta Christina Browne of THEM Anime similarly concurred that while the series "moves slowly and thus may not gain widespread appeal," its "poignancy and its adept choice of viewpoint as a reflective rather than purely nostalgic show ultimately win out over its mistakes."

The live-action film adaption of Kids on the Slope opened in eighth place at the Japanese box office. For his performance in the film, Taishi Nakagawa was nominated for Newcomer of the Year at the 42nd Japan Academy Film Prize awards in 2019.

References

External links
 Official series website 
 Official anime website
 Official live-action film website 
 
 

2007 manga
2012 anime television series debuts
Aniplex
Coming-of-age anime and manga
MAPPA
Music in anime and manga
Noitamina
School life in anime and manga
Sentai Filmworks
Shogakukan manga
Slice of life anime and manga
Television series set in the 1960s
Tezuka Productions
Winners of the Shogakukan Manga Award for general manga
Japanese drama films